Domingo Diaz (born 4 February 1948) is an Australian sports shooter. He competed in the mixed trap event at the 1988 Summer Olympics.

References

External links
 

1948 births
Living people
Australian male sport shooters
Olympic shooters of Australia
Shooters at the 1988 Summer Olympics
Place of birth missing (living people)
Commonwealth Games medallists in shooting
Commonwealth Games bronze medallists for Australia
Shooters at the 1986 Commonwealth Games
20th-century Australian people
Medallists at the 1986 Commonwealth Games